Father Hood is a 1993 American adventure comedy-drama film directed by Darrell Roodt, from a screenplay by Scott Spencer (of Endless Love fame). The movie stars Patrick Swayze and Halle Berry.

Plot 
Siblings Kelly and Eddie Charles eagerly await alongside journalist Kathleen Mercer for the release of their father Jack Charles from prison. 

Fifteen months earlier, Kelly escapes from the corrupt state-run home in LA Bigelow Hall by breaking a window and fleeing in the night. Jack is a petty criminal facing prison time. He robbed drug dealers until he robbed an uncover cop posing as one. He's also waiting for a large deal to come in. With their mother dead, the kids were left in the foster system. 

Kelly finds Jack when she’s out, telling him that her 7-year-old brother Eddie is about to be placed in Bigelow Hall. She describes to him their abusive treatment, including putting them in handcuffs. 

After witnessing director Lazzaro lying to the court at Eddie’s custody hearing, Jack sees the kids are put in shackles and takes matters into his own hands. He hijacks the bus taking Eddie to Bigelow and breaks him out. 

Intending to dump the kids with their grifter grandmother Rita in Vegas, Jack can’t do so as their case has made national news. Besides, she later reminds him that as they are his kids, they are his responsibility. Reporter Mercer has published an article full of lies, making him seem dangerous. 

So, Jack calls her out for her flawed reporting but she's actually investigating the Hall for fraud. Mercer asks him to find out if the kids really go on the field trips or get meat regularly as the director claims they do. 

The three start off on an adventure across country, all the while Jack keeps telling himself that he has to get rid of the kids. On the way there, he starts to fall in love with them. Eddie insists they stop to see the Hoover Dam, where they are spotted. Jack creates a distraction so they can sneak off in a hot-wired car. On the road, they head through Texas, bound for New Orleans. There he plans to pull off a big heist that could set them up for life.

In the meantime, Mercer tries to track down Dolores, Kelly’s pregnant friend from Bigelow Hall. But Mrs. Carter who had been her foster mother would’ve adopted her, tells her they recaptured her. 

When Jack has Kelly drive, she crashes the car, so they head out on foot. They stow away on a boat being towed to Louisiana. When it’s lowered to the water, they race away. A police chopper and another news one catches up to them, but when a flare is accidentally set off in the boat the family jumps off as they can’t be seen in the smoke. 

They hitchhike the last 90 miles to New Orleans. There, Jack finds Jerry, his partner for the heist. He gets called by Mercer, offering him a reduced sentence of only two years (reduced to 18 months on good behavior) if he helps gets the truth out about the youth detention center and prosecute the home. It is molesting children and billing for trips with them that never really took place. Jack has to decide whether he should take the money and run or look out for his new found family's interests.

The next morning when Jack is looking for Kelly, Eddie tells him she’s gone to meet with Andy, an intern at Bigelow who lives in New Orleans. She mistook his kindness for something more, and is heartbroken. 

That night the kids stow away in the trunk of Jerry’s car, as he and Jack have gotten on the almost empty ferry to Algiers to steal $250,000. The kids draw attention to the pair, the target is alerted, and Jerry is shot down but Jack and the kids aren’t pursued. 

In court, Jack and Kelly speak out against Bigelow director Lazzaro, helping in the prosecution of the Hall for fraud.

The final scene is of the family of three in a group hug.

Cast 
 Patrick Swayze as Jack Charles
 Halle Berry as Kathleen Mercer
 Sabrina Lloyd as Kelly Charles
 Brian Bonsall as Eddie Charles
 Michael Ironside as Jerry
 Diane Ladd as Rita
 Bob Gunton as Lazzaro
 Adrienne Barbeau as Celeste
 Josh Lucas as Andy

Locations 
Father Hood was shot in Los Angeles, California, Hoover Dam, Arizona-Nevada Border, Las Vegas, Nevada, Rio Medina, Texas, and New Orleans, Louisiana.

Release

Critical reception 
The film was released in North America on August 27, 1993 to generally unfavorable reviews from critics. On Rotten Tomatoes it holds a score of 10% based on 20 reviews, with an average rating of 2.8/10.

Box office 
Father Hood opened at No. 15 at the North American box office, with only $1,286,806 on its opening weekend. Its widest release was 643 theaters. By the end of its run, the film has grossed $3,418,141 worldwide.

References

External links 
 
 

1993 films
1990s adventure comedy-drama films
1990s chase films
1990s crime comedy-drama films
1990s road comedy-drama films
American adventure comedy-drama films
American adventure thriller films
American chase films
American crime comedy-drama films
American road comedy-drama films
American courtroom films
Films about child abduction in the United States
Films about child abuse
Films about families
Films about miscarriage of justice
Films about siblings
Films directed by Darrell Roodt
Films set in the United States
Films shot in Arizona
Films shot in Los Angeles
Films shot in Nevada
Films shot in New Orleans
Films shot in San Antonio
Hollywood Pictures films
1990s English-language films
1990s American films